Eloquence is a live album by jazz pianist Oscar Peterson and his trio, released in 1965.

Eloquence was the Oscar Peterson trio's last album with drummer Ed Thigpen.

Reception

Writing for AllMusic, critic Scott Yanow wrote "The music heard during this "live from Copenhagen" concert is excellent... Peterson is in particularly strong form on "Misty," "Django," a cooking "Autumn Leaves" and "Moanin'."

Track listing
"Children's Tune" (Oscar Peterson) – 1:09
"Younger Than Springtime" (Oscar Hammerstein II, Richard Rodgers) – 5:29
"Misty" (Johnny Burke, Erroll Garner) – 6:41
"Django" (John Lewis) – 7:21
"The Smudge" (Peterson) – 5:07
"Autumn Leaves" (Joseph Kosma, Johnny Mercer, Jacques Prévert) – 6:42
"Moanin'" (Bobby Timmons) – 6:07
"Lovers' Promenade" (Peterson) – 2:26

Personnel
Oscar Peterson – piano
Ray Brown – double bass
Ed Thigpen – drums

References

1965 live albums
Limelight Records live albums
Oscar Peterson live albums